The La Tablada Israelite Cemetery, also known simply as the La Tablada Cemetery, is a Jewish cemetery located in the city of La Tablada, in the Greater Buenos Aires conurbation of Argentina. It was established in 1936 and is operated by the Asociación Mutual Israelita Argentina (AMIA).

Housing over 150,000 graves, it is the largest Jewish cemetery in Latin America.

Vandalism
La Tablada Cemetery has been subject to frequent vandalism, often of anti-semitic nature. In 1999, 62 headstones were damaged on the eve of Yom Kippur. In 2021, over 100 headstones were smashed, echoing a similar vandalic event in 2009. In 2022, over 300 plaques were stolen and a monument in remembrance of the 1994 AMIA bombing was damaged.

Notable burials
 Pepe Eliaschev (1945–2014), journalist and writer
 Jorge Guinzburg (1949–2008), journalist and TV host
 Natacha Jaitt (1978–2019), model and TV host
 Miguel Najdorf (1910–1997), chess champion
 Alberto Nisman (1963–2015), lawyer and prosecutor
 Alejandro Romay (1927–2015), businessman and media mogul
 Alejandra Pizarnik (1936–1972), poet and translator
 Efim Schachmeister (1894-1944), jazz violinist and conductor
 Mauro Viale (1947–2021), journalist

References

External links

 Burial search 

1936 establishments in Argentina
Jewish cemeteries in Argentina
Cemeteries in Buenos Aires
Jews and Judaism in Buenos Aires
La Matanza Partido
Cemeteries established in the 1930s